Mingo is an unincorporated village in Upper Providence Township, Montgomery County, Pennsylvania, United States, just southeast of Royersford close to the Schuylkill River.

Mingo had a Post Office from 1880–1883.

References 

Unincorporated communities in Montgomery County, Pennsylvania
Populated places on the Schuylkill River
Unincorporated communities in Pennsylvania